Red-eyed bulbul may refer to:

 African red-eyed bulbul, a species of bird found in south-western Africa
 Asian red-eyed bulbul, a species of bird found in south-eastern Asia

Birds by common name